Optioservus phaeus, the Scott optioservus riffle beetle, is a species of riffle beetle in the family Elmidae. It is only found in North America, specifically at Lake Scott State Park in Scott County, Kansas.

References

Further reading

 
 
 

Elmidae
Articles created by Qbugbot
Beetles described in 1978